Disaster at Silo 7 is a 1988 American made-for-television thriller-drama film directed by Larry Elikann.
It is loosely based on the 1980 Damascus Titan missile explosion.

Plot 
During routine maintenance of a liquid-fuelled ICBM, the fuel tank is penetrated by a falling socket. The film traces the efforts of the maintenance crew and associated military and civilian personnel to recover the potentially disastrous situation before the fuel tank is sufficiently depressurised that the stack collapses and explodes.

Cast 
 
 Michael O'Keefe as Sgt. Mike Fitzgerald
 Perry King as Maj. Hicks
 Patricia Charbonneau as Kathy Fitzgerald
 Peter Boyle as Gen. Sanger
 Joe Spano as Sgt. Swofford
 Ray Baker as Col. Chadwick
 Dennis Weaver as Sheriff Ben Harlen
  Joe Urla as Pepper Martinelli
 Brent Jennings as A.C. Jones
 Christian Clemenson as Col. Brandon
 Ken Jenkins as Clarence
 Maureen Teefy as Penny Travers

Influence 
Inspired by the 1980 Damascus Titan missile explosion, Jeffrey K. Kennedy, one of the main protagonists of the Damascus event, was a special technical advisor for this movie.

References

External links 

1988 television films
1988 films
1980s thriller drama films
American thriller drama films
Thriller films based on actual events
Films directed by Larry Elikann
Films scored by Mark Snow
American thriller television films
American drama television films
1980s American films
Films set in Arkansas